is a Japanese animator and character designer. His debut as a chief character designer was with Hime-chan's Ribbon, and he has frequently worked with Akitaro Daichi on anime titles.

Works
Akazukin Chacha:Character Design, Animation Director (episodes 14, 26, 40, 51, 65)
Animation Runner Kuromi:Character Design, Animation Director
Carried by the Wind: Tsukikage Ran:Character Design
Cross Fight B-Daman:Assistant producer
Cross Fight B-Daman eS:Assistant producer
Ginga e Kickoff!!:Character Design, Chief Animation Director
Hiatari Ryōkō!:Animation Director
Hime-chan's Ribbon:Character Design, Chief Animation Director, Animation Director (episodes 1, 6, 11, 17, 23, 26, 29, 32, 35, 39, 42, 45, 51, 56, 60)
Kaleido Star:Character Design, Chief Animation Director
Kero Kero Chime:Main Character Design
Kiteretsu Daihyakka:Character Design, Chief Animation Director
Kodomo no Omocha:Character Design
Les Misérables: Shōjo Cosette:Character Design
Now and Then, Here and There:Key Animation (episodes 1, 13)
Nurse Angel Ririka SOS:Character Design, Chief Animation Director, Animation Director (episodes 6, 11, 15–16, 24)
Ojarumaru:Character Design
School Rumble:Character Design, Animation Director (Opening; Ending; episode 1)
Tamayura:Animation Director (episode 2, 4)
Isekai no Seikishi Monogatari:Character Design, Chief Animation Director
Uta Kata:Ending Illustration (episode 8)
Captain Tsuasa (2018): Character Design

External links

1957 births
Living people
Japanese animators
Anime character designers